Gillian Hanna (20 June 1944 – 18 August 2019) was an Irish stage, film, TV and voice actress. She founded the feminist Monstrous Regiment Theatre Company about which she wrote a book that was published in 1991.

Early life
Hanna graduated with a First Class degree in Modern Languages from Trinity College, Dublin. She went on to work as an actor as well as a translator.

Career
In 1975, Hanna founded the feminist Monstrous Regiment Theatre Company. Hanna worked with the company for fifteen years. In 1981, she starred in Honor Moore's Mourning Pictures at the Tricycle Theatre, a Monstrous Regiment Theatre Company production, with original music by Tony Haynes. The play was broadcast on BBC Radio 4 in May 1982.

She later published a book about the company, Monstrous Regiment: A Collective Celebration. An essay of hers, "An Age Of Innocence", was published in the collection Trinity Tales: Trinity College In The Sixties. She has extensive credits on stage as well as on TV and film.

Hanna also had a bit part playing the very fragile and somewhat 'delicate' typist teacher Mrs Gossage in the sixth series of Grange Hill (1983) and played the sister of the evil Trevor Jordache in Brookside during the infamous 'body under the patio' storyline in the 1990s.

Books
 Monstrous Regiment: A Collective Celebration, London: Nick Hern Books, (1991)

Partial filmography 

 Full House (1973, TV Series) - Actress in Plugged Into History
 Grange Hill (1983, TV Series) - Mrs. Gossage
 Brookside (1983-1995, TV Series) - Brenna Jordache / Mrs. Brown
 The Fear (1988, TV Series) - Mrs. Broderick
 All Creatures Great and Small (1988, TV Series) - Betty Sanders
 The Wolves of Willoughby Chase (1989) - Mrs. Shubunkin
 Making News (1990, TV Series) - Mrs. Gurney
 EastEnders (1991, TV Series) - Mrs. Desmond
 All Good Things (1991, TV Series) - Mrs. Grant
 The House of Bernarda Alba (1991, TV Movie) - Maid
 Poirot (1993, TV Series) - Margaret Baker
 The Marshal (1993) - Maria Pia
 15: The Life and Death of Philip Knight (1995, TV Movie) - Margareth Knight
 Desmond's (1993, TV Series) - Pamela
 Screenplay (1993, TV Series) - Eileen
 Drop the Dead Donkey (1994, TV Series) - Mrs. Babcock
 Casualty (1995-2007, TV Series) - Sal Rhodes / Mrs. Mohan
 The Heart Surgeon (1997, TV Movie) - Margot
 Dangerfield (1997, TV Series) - Julie Hanson
 Les Misérables (1998, directed by Bille August) - Mme. Thénardier
 All the Queen's Men (2001, directed by Stefan Ruzowitzky) - Nettie
 Weirdsister College (2001, TV Series) - Josie Foster
 The Heart of Me (2002, directed by Thaddeus O'Sullivan) - Betty / Maid
 Oliver Twist (2005, directed by Roman Polanski) - Mrs. Sowerberry
 Doctors (2006, TV Series) - Pat Bishop
 The Kindness of Strangers (2006, TV Movie, directed by Tony Smith) - Hannah
 Mist: The Tale of a Sheepdog Puppy (2006, TV Movie) - Swift
 Mist: Sheepdog Tales (2007-2009, TV Series) - Swift / Queenie Creamer / MacPhereson Sister
 Inspector George Gently (2008, TV Movie) - Mabs Hardyment
 Mr. Nice (2010, directed by Bernard Rose) - Irish Phone Operator
 Married Single Other (2010, TV Series) - Mrs. Kelly
 Strike Back (2011, TV Series) - Joanna Heath
 National Theatre Live: Treasure Island (2015, directed by Polly Findlay) - Grandma
 The Amazing World of Gumball (2015-2019, TV Series) - Betty McArthur (Season 4-6)
 Genius (2016, directed by Michael Grandage) - Julia Wolfe
 Ethel & Ernest (2016, directed by Roger Mainwood) - Midwife / Aunty Flo (voice)

References

External links
 
 Agent's Biography
 
 
 National Theatre
Official Monstrous Regiment Theatre Company website

1944 births
2019 deaths
20th-century Irish actresses
21st-century Irish actresses
Irish film actresses
Irish television actresses
Irish stage actresses